Wheelchair basketball at the 2011 Canada Winter Games was held at Citadel High School in Halifax.

The tournament will be held during the first week between February 13 and 17, 2011. The tournament is a mix of both genders

Mixed

Medalists

Key

Group A

Group B

Placement round

Medal Round

Bronze Medal March

Gold Medal March

Final standings

References

2011 Canada Winter Games